Celleneuve (Cèlanòva in Occitan) is a part of Mosson neighbourhood, in the West of the city of Montpellier, Hérault, France.

The place name can be translated as new cellar. It first appeared in Aniane's cartulary, written in 799, where it is mentioned that Benedict of Aniane (c. 747-821) created a priory, called Cella nova on the soil of Juvignac, even before the city of Montpellier was founded (first mentioned in a document of 985).

Equipments
 Maison pour tous Marie Curie
 Caisse d'allocations familiales
 Parc Dioscorides
 Esplanade Léo Malet

People from Celleneuve:
 Abbé Fabre (1727–1783), a prior of Celleneuve, writer of Occitan literature, whose Sermoun de moussu sistre, delivered by a drunken priest against intemperance, is a masterpiece.
 Léo Malet (1909-1996), a crime novelist and the creator of fiction character Nestor Burma.

References

External links 

 Association of Celleneuve inhabitants Website (French)
 Blog (Occitan)

Montpellier